Johannes "Hans" Segers (born 30 October 1961) is a Dutch football coach and former professional player who played as a goalkeeper.

As a player, he notably spent eight years with Wimbledon where he featured in the Premier League. He also played in England's top flight for Nottingham Forest and Tottenham Hotspur. He had spells in his native the Netherlands with PSV Eindhoven and in Scotland with Dunfermline Athletic, and in the Football League with Sheffield United, Stoke City, Wolverhampton Wanderers.

Playing career
Segers was born in Eindhoven, North Brabant. His early career was with home-town club PSV Eindhoven, before being signed for Nottingham Forest by Brian Clough during the 1983–84 season. In his first season with Forest he played 32 times but lost his place to Steve Sutton and played in 12 matches in 1985–86. He made 18 appearances in 1986–87 and signed for Stoke City on loan in March 1987 playing in one Second Division match for the "Potters", a 4–1 defeat away at West Bromwich Albion. He played five games in 1987–88 with Sutton injured, but was clearly second choice despite he and Sutton being of similar ability. He spent time that season out on loan at Sheffield United and Scottish side Dunfermline Athletic.

His career revived when he was signed as replacement for Dave Beasant by Wimbledon in the aftermath of their FA Cup glory in 1988, his long kicks suiting Wimbledon's style of play, as Beasant's had done. He would remain the club's first choice goalkeeper over the next eight seasons, making 265 league appearances. Although he was unable to help Wimbledon win any more silverware, they never finished lower than 14th in the top flight in any of the eight seasons he played for them, and peaked at sixth place in the FA Premier League in 1994.

In 1994, he was accused of involvement in match fixing, together with Liverpool goalkeeper Bruce Grobbelaar, Wimbledon striker John Fashanu and a Malaysian businessman. The case was referred to Winchester Crown Court for a criminal trial in 1997 but all four defendants were cleared. In December 1997, Grobbelaar and Segers were found guilty by the Football Association of breaching betting regulations.

In the summer of 1996, Segers signed for Wolverhampton Wanderers as understudy to Mike Stowell. A brief spell in the Conference with Woking followed, before he made a remarkable return to the Premier League scene with Tottenham Hotspur, where he spent three years (playing just one league game) as a standby goalkeeper until he finally retired in the summer of 2001, a few months before his 40th birthday.

Coaching career
He was goalkeeper-coach at Tottenham Hotspur until 26 October 2007 when he was asked to stand down with immediate effect following the sacking of Martin Jol.

Segers returned to his home-town club, PSV Eindhoven as a goalkeeping coach in July 2008 until June 2011, when he linked up again with new Fulham manager Jol as Fulham's goalkeeping coach. 

In November 2018 Hans assumed the role of goalkeeper coach with the Australian national team until the completion of the AFC Asian Cup UAE 2019.

Career statistics

References

Living people
1961 births
Footballers from Eindhoven
Dutch footballers
Association football goalkeepers
English Football League players
Scottish Football League players
Premier League players
Eredivisie players
PSV Eindhoven players
Nottingham Forest F.C. players
Stoke City F.C. players
Sheffield United F.C. players
Dunfermline Athletic F.C. players
Wimbledon F.C. players
Wolverhampton Wanderers F.C. players
Woking F.C. players
Tottenham Hotspur F.C. players
Tottenham Hotspur F.C. non-playing staff
Fulham F.C. non-playing staff
Dutch expatriate footballers
Dutch expatriate sportspeople in England
Expatriate footballers in England
Dutch expatriate sportspeople in Scotland
Expatriate footballers in Scotland
Association football controversies
Sportspeople involved in betting scandals